Wanham is a hamlet in northern Alberta, Canada within Birch Hills County. Saddle River, a tributary of Peace River, flows immediately north of the community. The origin of the name Wanham could have come from Wanham in England.

The local economy is based on agriculture and ranching, the settlement being an agricultural service centre for the surrounding farms. A wood products plant, Newpro, was previously the largest employer in the settlement. It was announced it was closing in January 2006.

History 
It was established in 1916 as a station on the Edmonton, Dunvegan and British Columbia Railway. The first post office was built in 1918.

It was incorporated as a village, but dissolved and merged with Birch Hills County in 1999 by Order in Council 458/99. Birch Hills County's municipal office is located in Wanham.

Demographics 

Attractions 
A yearly plowing competition takes place in Wanham since 1971. It is currently named Alberta Provincial and Canadian Plowing Match and includes a horse drawn antique parade, live music and fashion show.

The Grizzly Bear Prairie Museum is seasonally opened in Wanham. It was founded in 1979 by a group called the Community of Cooperating Organization (COCO for short). It was officially opened in 1981.

Climate

See also 
List of communities in Alberta
List of former urban municipalities in Alberta
List of hamlets in Alberta

References 

Birch Hills County
Designated places in Alberta
Former villages in Alberta
Hamlets in Alberta
Populated places disestablished in 1999